Bayen Hath Ka Khel is a 1985 Hindi film directed by Vijay Kaul and produced by Khaliq Paria. Vijay Kaul debuted as a director with this film. This film has Rajesh Khanna in the lead opposite Tina Munim. The movie could not be released for unknown reasons.

Cast
Rajesh Khanna 
Tina Munim
Pran
Waheeda Rehman
Danny Denzongpa 
Girish Karnad  
Kulbhushan Kharbanda

Music

References

External links
 

1985 films
Indian romantic drama films
Films scored by Laxmikant–Pyarelal
1980s Hindi-language films